The 2002–03 LEB 2 season was the 3rd season of the LEB Plata, second league of the Liga Española de Baloncesto and third division in Spain.

Competition format
16 teams play during the regular season. It is a round robin tournament, where each team will play against every rival twice. After the regular season, the eight top ranked teams play in the playoffs, were the two finalists are promoted to LEB.

The last qualified team was relegated to Liga EBA, with the loser of the relegation playoffs, played by the 16th and the 17th qualified teams.

If two or more teams have got the same number of winning games, the criteria of tie-breaking are these:
Head-to-head winning games.
Head-to-head points difference.
Total points difference.

Regular season

League table

Promotion playoffs

Relegation playoffs

MVP of the regular season
 John Schuck

External links
LEB Plata website in FEB.es

LEB Plata seasons
LEB3